The 2015 Dutch Basketball Supercup was the 5th edition of the annual super cup game in Dutch basketball. This year reigning champions SPM Shoeters Den Bosch faced off against Donar Groningen, the 2014–15 NBB Cup winners. 

Den Bosch won its first Supercup title.

Teams

Match

References

Super
Dutch Basketball Supercup